Baltimore Hebrew Congregation Synagogue, now known as Berea Temple Seventh Day Adventist Church, is a historic synagogue building located in the Madison Park neighborhood of Baltimore, Maryland, United States. The former synagogue, built as an early home of the Baltimore Hebrew Congregation, is built of ashlar gray granite from Port Deposit, Maryland.  It is a well-executed, 19th century version of a Byzantine church, designed by Charles L. Carson, a Baltimore architect.  It features a large central dome, 40 feet in diameter, resting on a high octagonal drum pierced by rectangular windows of stained glass and two tall octagonal towers flanking the main entrance.

Baltimore Hebrew Congregation Synagogue was listed on the National Register of Historic Places in 1976.

See also
 Eutaw Place Temple, similar in scale and style, two blocks to the east in the Bolton Hill Historic District

References

External links
, including photo from 1976, at Maryland Historical Trust
Berea Temple Seventh Day Adventist Church website

Byzantine Revival architecture in Maryland
Byzantine Revival synagogues
Central Baltimore
Charles L. Carson buildings
Former synagogues in Maryland
Properties of religious function on the National Register of Historic Places in Baltimore
Synagogues completed in 1890
Synagogue buildings with domes
Synagogues in Baltimore
Synagogues on the National Register of Historic Places in Maryland